Knott End railway station served Knott End on Sea in Lancashire, England, with a ferry service to Fleetwood. The station opened in 1908 and closed for passengers in 1930 and for freight in 1950.

History 
The station opened on 30 July 1908 by the Knott End Railway. It was situated on the south side of Bourne May Road. It had a station building and a goods shed with two sidings, a loading ramp, a crane and a weighbridge, all of which were to the west. Like the other stations on the line, the bus service introduced in the 1920s deemed this station uneconomical, so it closed to passengers on 31 March 1930 and to goods on 13 November 1950. The track was lifted after 1953. The station building is now a cafe.

References

External links 

Disused railway stations in the Borough of Wyre
The Fylde
Railway stations in Great Britain opened in 1908
Railway stations in Great Britain closed in 1930
1908 establishments in England